Tongliao Airport  is an airport in Tongliao, Inner Mongolia, People’s Republic of China.

Airlines and destinations

See also
List of airports in China

References

Airports in Inner Mongolia